Heteroplectron is a genus of caddisflies in the family Calamoceratidae. There are at least three described species in Heteroplectron.

Species
These three species belong to the genus Heteroplectron:
 Heteroplectron americanum (Walker, 1852)
 Heteroplectron californicum McLachlan, 1871
 Heteroplectron yamaguchii Tsuda, 1942

References

Further reading

 
 
 

Trichoptera genera
Articles created by Qbugbot
Integripalpia